Bernard Irvine Nicholls (born June 24, 1961) is a Canadian former professional ice hockey centre, who played over 1000 games in the National Hockey League (NHL). His junior career was spent with the Kingston Canadians, where he established himself as a dynamic scorer and a multi-faceted talent. He was selected by the Los Angeles Kings in the fourth round of the 1980 NHL Entry Draft, 73rd overall. Over his 17-year playing career, Nicholls played 1,127 games for the Los Angeles Kings, New York Rangers, Edmonton Oilers, New Jersey Devils, Chicago Blackhawks and San Jose Sharks, scoring 1,209 points. He is one of only eight players in NHL history to score 70 goals in one season, and one of five to score 150 points. Nicholls was born in Haliburton, Ontario, but grew up in West Guilford, Ontario.

Professional career

Los Angeles Kings
After Nicholls was drafted, he played one more year of junior hockey before making his professional debut with the New Haven Nighthawks of the American Hockey League (AHL). He scored 41 goals in 55 games as a rookie, and was recalled to the Kings on February 18, 1982, to finish the season, where he had 32 points in 22 games. He was a contributor in the playoffs as the Kings upset the Edmonton Oilers to reach the second round. He also scored hat tricks in three straight home games in that rookie season. Nicholls would never again play in the minor leagues.

During his first full season in the NHL, Nicholls played behind Hall of Fame centre Marcel Dionne and posted 28 goals and 50 points in 71 games. The following year Nicholls led the team in scoring with 95 points and then hit 100 points in 1984–85. He continued to be a valuable offensive contributor over the two seasons and took over first-line centre duties when Dionne was traded in March 1987.

Injuries that limited Nicholls to just 65 games in 1987–88, and the rise of young centre Jimmy Carson, saw Nicholls slip to third in team scoring but a trade that shook the entire NHL would change his fortunes. On August 9, 1988, the Edmonton Oilers and Los Angeles Kings completed a blockbuster trade that sent Wayne Gretzky to Los Angeles for a package including Carson to Edmonton. Slotting into the second-line centre job behind Gretzky set the stage for Nicholls' most productive season. He scored a team-record 70 goals and added 80 assists for a total of 150 points. The totals put Nicholls in rare company, and with 70 goals, he joined a group of just eight players to hit that plateau and his 150 points put him a group of just five players in league history to achieve that level of scoring.

The following season, Nicholls continued producing points at an impressive pace for Los Angeles, highlighted by an eight-point effort on December 1, 1988, against the Toronto Maple Leafs, which put Nicholls into another small group, becoming one of only 13 players in NHL history to record an eight-point game. By the All-Star break, Nicholls had 75 points in 47 games and was selected, along with teammates Gretzky, Luc Robitaille and Steve Duchesne to play in the All-Star Game. The night before the All-Star Game, the Kings shocked the hockey world by shipping Nicholls to the New York Rangers in exchange for wingers Tomas Sandström and Tony Granato. Despite now playing for an Eastern Conference team, Nicholls played in the All-Star Game the next day representing the Western Conference (and playing against his new teammate Brian Leetch.) Despite his solid offensive production, the Kings were having a mediocre season with a 21-21-5 record at the time of the deal. Kings owner Bruce McNall felt "something was missing" and that the Kings were "soft" and needed some grit. Nicholls left the Kings as the franchise's fifth all-time leading scorer.

New York Rangers

Nicholls joined the New York Rangers following the All-Star Game and while he did not keep up his torrid scoring pace, he did produce at over a point-a-game pace for New York. The following season he again was over a point-a-game but his goal production dipped to just 25, and the Rangers were eliminated in the first round of the Playoffs. Just one game into the 1991–92 season Nicholls was again involved in a blockbuster transaction when Rangers general manager Neil Smith packaged him up with prospects Steven Rice and Louie DeBrusk and shipped him to the Edmonton Oilers in exchange for Mark Messier. Nicholls, however, did not report to the Oilers for two full months because his wife was pregnant with twins and on bed rest. A week after the babies were born he finally left New York to join the Oilers after surrendering over a quarter of a million dollars in salary for not reporting.

Edmonton Oilers
When Nicholls did finally join the Oilers, he managed to produce despite the distractions of having his wife back in New York with his newborn children, and trade rumours suggesting he might not stay in Edmonton long. He posted 49 points in 49 games with the Oilers and rediscovered his scoring touch posting 20 goals in those 49 games. He saved his best production for the post season where he helped lead the Oilers to the Conference Final. He was particularly effective in the first round where he posted five goals and 13 points in a six-game defeat of his former team, the Los Angeles Kings. However, the following year, his production slowed down and the Oilers finally accommodated his wish to move back East when they dealt him to the New Jersey Devils for young forwards Kevin Todd and Zdeno Ciger.

Later career
Nicholls adapted his game to become more of a defensive forward in the tight-checking system of then-Devils coach Jacques Lemaire. When his contract expired, Nicholls signed a two-year deal with the Chicago Blackhawks, where he was allowed to take more offensive liberties. He averaged better than a point-per-game in Chicago.

Nicholls finished his NHL career with the San Jose Sharks. At the age of 36, and with a budding young franchise, Nicholls took on more of an elder statesman role. At the end of the 1998–99 NHL season, Nicholls retired.

In early 2012 he returned to the Los Angeles Kings as a coaching consultant and won his first Stanley Cup ring in June of that year.

International play

Nicholls won a silver medal in the 1985 World Ice Hockey Championships while playing for Canada.

Personal life
Nicholls has three children with his former wife Heather, son Flynn and daughter McKenna who are twins and a son, Jack, who was born on November 25, 1992, and died six days before his first birthday on November 19, 1993. Nicholls is now engaged to Amanda McKenzie.

Awards
 Selected to three NHL All-Star Games: 1984, 1989 and 1990

Career statistics

Regular season and playoffs

International

See also
 List of NHL players with 1,000 games played
 List of NHL players with 1,000 points

References

External links
 

1961 births
Living people
Canadian ice hockey centres
Canadian ice hockey coaches
Chicago Blackhawks players
Edmonton Oilers players
Ice hockey people from Ontario
Kingston Canadians players
Los Angeles Kings coaches
Los Angeles Kings draft picks
Los Angeles Kings players
National Hockey League All-Stars
New Jersey Devils players
New York Rangers players
People from Haliburton County
San Jose Sharks players
Stanley Cup champions